Max Richard Menzel (born 30 March 1941) is a former Australian politician.

He was born in Tully in Queensland to Richard Franz Menzel and Dulcie Margaret, née Kelly on the 30th of March 1941. He had an Uncle Albert "Bill" Menzel whose whereabouts are unknown, his father had other siblings who are believed to now be deceased and lived in Germany where Max's father and Uncle immigrated from to Australia around the 1900s to 1920s. Albert Menzel called himself "Bill" around the period of World War 2 due to anti German prejudice, due to Germany being at War with Australia at the time. Max was a Cane Grower before entering politics and was the Chairman of directors of Babinda Sugar Mill for 10 years. On 28 August 1981 he married Margaret Frances Dall'Alba, with whom he had 4 children, 3 sons and a daughter; Carl Richard Menzel, Max Francis Menzel, Peter Gerard Menzel, and Katelyn Margaret Menzel.He is also has two grandchildren Elyce and Carlo Menzel

In 1980 he was elected to the Queensland Legislative Assembly as the National Party member for Mulgrave. He was Temporary Chairman of Committees from 1983 to 1986. Menzel was defeated in 1989.

Following his defeat, Menzel left the National Party after the state executive of the National Party led by President at the time, Sir Robert Sparkes overrode his endorsement despite his electorate council supporting him overwhelmingly with only 3 opposing him out of 40 delegates, in an event Max considered as retribution for supporting former Queensland Premier Sir Joh Bjelke-Petersen to whom Mr. Sparkes had fallen out with. He ran for Mulgrave as an independent in 1992 and was unsuccessful he went on farming on the family farm at miriwini and in 1995 decided to sell and move to the Burdekin and expand his operation , his wife Margaret ran for the federal seat of Dawson in 2004 as part of a loose group of independents endorsed by Bob Katter. In August 2012 he was elected president of Katter's Australian Party following the dismissal of Rowell Walton. Menzel resigned from both the position and the party in April 2013.

References

1941 births
Living people
National Party of Australia members of the Parliament of Queensland
Members of the Queensland Legislative Assembly